Kiss the Dust is a book written by Elizabeth Laird on the conflicts between the Iraqi Kurds and Saddam Hussein's regime. It is a young adult historical fiction novel about a twelve-year-old Kurdish girl and her family's escape from Iraq over the border into Iran. The book was originally published in Great Britain by William Heinemann Ltd. in 1991. It was first published in the US by Dutton Children's Books, a division of Penguin Books USA Inc. in 1992.

Plot summary 
When Tara Hawrami is returning from school one day, she witnesses Iranian troops shoot a mullah and an innocent boy reading a newspaper in broad daylight, it sight changes her thinking forever.  However, when she returns home she is stunned when her mother, Teriska Khan shows a very muted reaction; Teriska Khan reveals that she and Tara's father have been concealing the horrors of the ongoing war between Iraq and Iran from Tara, including shootings like the one Tara had witnessed.  That night, an injured intruder enters Tara's house, who turns out to be her Uncle Rostam, a Pesh Murga resistance fighter.   The following morning, Tara's father, Kak Soran, suddenly returns with Tara's brother, Ashti, and her grandmother from Baghdad.  Tara's life changes quickly and drastically from that moment on.

When Rostam and Ashti leave to join the resistance fighters, the pesh mergas, Kak Soran is soon forced to go into hiding as well when the authorities suspect he has been indirectly supporting the pesh murgas.   Tara's apprehension only grows when the rest of her family must escape into a village in the mountains soon afterward.  Life in the mountains is peaceful, but boring for Tara until the area ends up being bombed repeatedly, injuring Tara.   When Ashti arrives in the village after being injured, Kak Soran and Teriska Khan plan a risky escape to Iran through the mountains all the way to Iran where they wind up in a refugee camp for several months.  Ashti, fearing conscription into the Iranian army, runs back to Iraq while Teriska Khan becomes very ill and sad as her son does not return for many months. Gradually Teriska Khan does recover after Tara finds a friendly neighbour willing to help. Tara has to care of her mother and younger sister Hero, until Teriska Khan recovers.   Kak Soran's connections eventually come through and Tara's family manages to find help in the form of Kak Soran's cousin.  However, with no available jobs in Iran, the family realizes that they must escape the country to become refugees in another country.   Using the last of their savings, the family manages to arrive in London, where they apply for refugee status.

In London, Kak Soran manages to get in contact with a family friend (Latif), who offers them a place to stay.   In every place that Tara has been displaced to, she has experienced culture shock and needed to adjust quickly; At first the family has a hard time getting used to the new language and the new lifestyle. Tara's English gradually improves and despite the traumatic experiences she has endured, she manages to make some friends at her new school.  Her family is overjoyed they hear that Ashti will soon arrive in London after several years apart. Though their new life is difficult and less comfortable than their old home in Iraq, Tara learns not to take anything for granted. The family gets back together and begins to live a better, new life.

History
The story is based on a Kurdish family living in Sulaymaniyah, a city in northeastern Iraq in 1984 during a time of war.

Characters 
 Tara Hawrami  - A 13-year-old Kurdish girl living in Iraq with her family.  She is unaware of the conflict in her country, desiring the ordinary life she has always lived in the town of Sulamaniya.  However, as the war begins to affect her directly, she becomes increasingly aware of her circumstances and begins to take more responsibilities in caring for her mother and younger sister.   Through her experiences as an exile and a refugee, Tara matures and demonstrates courage.
Kak Soran - Tara's father, a businessman who works hard to support his family.  He secretly works as an informant to the pesh murgas, which forces him to flee into the mountains when he is discovered.  Though he is kind and generous, he is very strict and proud and wants to protect his family.
Teriska Khan - Tara, Hero, and Ashti's mother and Kak Soran's wife.   A kindhearted and protective woman, she is decisive and strong-willed, though apprehensive about risky decisions concerning her family.   Her sudden illness is a blow to the family, who has always seen Teriska Khan as a pillar of strength.
Ashti  - Tara and Hero's older brother, approximately 18 years old.  Because of his youth, he is eager to join Rostam and the pesh murgas, though he later reveals that working with Rostam is extremely demanding.  However, he is courageous and determined.
Hero - Tara's younger sister, around four years old.  She is playful and difficult to control, which proves to be dangerous to the family at times.  She adapts quickly to most situations, but is largely unaware of the circumstances behind them.
Uncle Rostam  - Kak Soran's brother, a pesh murga.  He is renowned as a charismatic leader, though Teriska Khan fears he is too reckless, particularly when Ashti joins him.   As a leader, Ashti reveals Rostam is controlling and demanding.
Granny - Tara's grandmother, an outspoken woman who advises Teriska Khan to leave for the mountains.
Leila  - Tara's best friend and neighbour, an Arab girl, though they are rarely divided by their differences.  Her family opposes the violent acts against Kurdish people done by the Iraqi government and Leila's mother, Mrs. Amina, later aids Tara's family in escaping to the mountains. Appears in many of Tara's wishes.
Baji Rezan  - A woman who gossips with other girls, which annoys Tara when she arrives in the mountains.  She ends up saving Tara's life during a bombing, after which Tara learns to appreciate and respect her.
Ghazal -Baji Rezan's daughter-in-law and a distant cousin of Tara's who lives in the mountains.  She has a young baby.
Latif  - A friend of Dabans, Kak Soran's cousin, who offers to let Tara's family stay at his flat when they arrive in London.

Themes 

Kiss the Dust focuses on a number of themes, including family, courage, loyalty, and coming-of-age.  Through her struggles, Tara is strengthened through her sense of family and matures through caring for her mother during her illness and watching over her younger sister.  Though her family is unable to remain together despite their efforts, they are driven to find a safe place regardless of how far they must go in order to be reunited some day.  The family remains loyal to themselves and trusting of others to help them through the hardships of war and the uncertainty of being refugees in foreign countries.  Tara endures her constant displacement with courage and increasing maturity as she takes on more responsibilities and takes initiative in protect her family.

Awards
 Winner of the 1992 Red House Children's Book Award
 Winner of the Sheffield Book Award
 Winner of the Royal Dutch Geographical Society Glass Globe Award
 Winner of the World Books

Footnotes 
 Information on the Book

External links

Comments on Kiss the Dust
Erdal Can Alkoçlar
Book Review on Kiss the Dust

References

British war novels
Novels set in Iraq
1991 British novels
British young adult novels
Heinemann (publisher) books